The Spicy Effect, commonly referred to as Spicy or Spicy Music, is a Greek independent record label founded in 2009 by songwriter and record producer Phoebus, in association with the investment arm of Nea Tileorasi.

Overview
After eight years under an exclusive songwriting and record production collaboration with independent record label Heaven Music of ANT1 Group, Phoebus announced on 21 October 2009 via his website that he had left the label, without providing further details. This news was followed by a statement from Despina Vandi that she had also left Heaven Music. The fate of the other artists under Heaven Music's roster with whom Phoebus exclusively collaborated were not disclosed by any of the concerned parties. By December 2009, Phoebus announced that he was starting his own record label, with Vandi being the first artist to sign. Thereafter more artist signings to Phoebus' company were announced, including a five-year contract with Elli Kokkinou following her departure from Sony Music Entertainment Greece, with whom Phoebus had worked with on two studio albums while both were under contract at Heaven Music. Nino and Thanos Petrelis, both of whom were also with Heaven Music, signed with the company. The company's trade name – The Spicy Effect – was also revealed following these signings.

In April 2010, The Spicy Effect obtained a digital distribution deal under a licensing agreement with Universal Music Greece, which grants access to popular services such as iTunes Store. C'est La Vie by Vandi marks the first studio album released by the label.

In July 2011, The Spicy Effect announced a collaboration with the record label My Group, founded by Manos Theofilos. The label focuses on dance music and is credited with a number of hits since its inception.

Charity
In December 2010, a remake of Vandi's Christmas song "Christougenna" (Christmas), titled "Christougenna 2010", was released featuring vocals by the entire Spicy Effect roster of artists- Kokkinou, Nino, Panos Kalidis, Elissavet Spanou, Ioakeim Fokas, and Stella Kalli, with the exception of Vandi. The song also features the well-known Spiros Lambrou's children choir. Vandi could not participate in the remake as a clause from her previous recording contract prohibited her from re-recording the song on a different label, however she does appear in the music video. The remake was brought into fruition after Nino held a benefit concert in Agrinio in the summer to raise funds for the rehabilitation of 23-year-old paraplegic Petros Zaferis. Proceeds from the sale of the digital release also went toward his rehabilitation.

Spicy Entertainment
In early 2011, The Spicy Effect launched Spicy Entertainment, a concert promoting division dealing across Greece and Cyprus, servicing foreign acts.

The Spicy Labels

"The Spicy Effect" has also three labels under this label:

a) "Loca Records by Spicy" was created by Christodoulos Siganos and Valentino, with artists such as DJ Valentino, Constantinos Pantzis, Christina Koletsa and Hrispa (http://www.loca-records.com)

b) "Nuke Records by Spicy / The Urban music label" with artists, such as REC and FlyByWire and

c) "Noize The Label" (née Legend Music) with artists such as Giorgos Giasemis, Nikos Apergis, Dimitris Giotis, Thelxi, Andreas Stamos, Angelos Andreatos. This label is specialized in Laïko music.

References

External links
 The Spicy Effect
 Spicy Entertainment

Greek independent record labels
Greek brands
Pop record labels
Record labels established in 2009